Jozef Solymosy (born 23 July 2005) is a Slovak artistic swimmer. In 2022, he won an historic, first-time medal for Slovakia in artistic swimming event at a LEN European Aquatics Championships, with his older sister Silvia Solymosyová winning the bronze medal in the mixed duet free routine at the 2022 European Aquatics Championships, as well as a bronze medal in the mixed duet technical routine.

Background
Solymosy was born 23 July 2005 in Bratislava. He has one older sister Silvia and one younger brother Ivan.

Career

2019 World Youth Artistic Swimming Championships
Competing at the 2019 World Youth Artistic Swimming Championships, held in Šamorín, Slovakia Solymosy placed third in the solo figures with a score of 70.3333 points. He also placed fifth in the mixed duet event with a score of 141.2158 points.

2021 European Championships
At the 2021 European Championships held in Budapest, Hungary, Solymosy placed fourth twice (mixed duets).

2022 World Aquatics Championships
At the 2022 World Aquatics Championships again in Budapest, Hungary, Solymosy placed ninth in the free mixed duet and tenth in the technical mixed duet.

2022 European Championships
In the mixed duet free routine at the 2022 European Aquatics Championships, he won the bronze medal with his partner Silvia Solymosyová with a score of 77.0333 points. He also won a bronze medal in the mixed duet technical routine with a score of 75.5914 points.

International championships

See also
Slovakia at the 2022 World Aquatics Championships

References

External links
 Jozef Solymosy at FINA

2005 births
Living people
Male synchronized swimmers
Slovak synchronized swimmers
Artistic swimmers at the 2022 World Aquatics Championships
European Aquatics Championships medalists in synchronised swimming
Sportspeople from Bratislava